Sharp is the debut studio album by American recording artist Angela Winbush, after she left the duo Rene & Angela. The album was released in September 1987 on Mercury Records and peaked at #7 on the Billboard R&B Albums chart and at #81 on the Billboard 200.

The album spawned four singles which were all commercially successful on the US R&B singles chart, including the album's lead single "Angel" which peaked at #1 on Billboard's Hot R&B Songs.

On the vinyl pressing, tracks 1–5 were known as the "Slammin' Side", while tracks 6–9 were known as the "Quiet Storm Side". The album, as well as the single "Angel", were nominated for a Soul Train Music Award in 1988.

Track listing
All songs written, arranged, produced and performed by Angela Winbush, except where noted.

Personnel
Angela Winbush - Lead & Backing Vocals, Keyboards, Synthesizers, Drum Programming, Electric & Synthesized Bass, Percussion
Paul Jackson, Jr., Wah-Wah Watson, Tony Maiden - Guitars
Louis Johnson, Nathan East - Bass
Rayford Griffin - Drums
Paulinho Da Costa - Percussion

Production
Executive Producer: Ronald Isley
Produced By Angela Winbush
Engineered By Steve Sykes
Mixed By Angela Winbush & Steve Sykes
Mastered By Brian Gardner
All Songs Published By Angel Notes Music

Charts

External links
"Sharp" by Angela Winbush at discogs; Accessed Oct. 22, 2010

References

Whitburn, Joel (2000).  Top R&B Albums:  1965-1998.  Record Research.  

1987 debut albums
Angela Winbush albums
Mercury Records albums